The School of Flesh is a 1998 French drama film directed by Benoît Jacquot, based on the 1963 novel Nikutai no gakkō by Yukio Mishima. It was entered into the 1998 Cannes Film Festival.

Cast
 Isabelle Huppert as Dominique
 Vincent Martinez as Quentin
 Vincent Lindon as Chris
 Marthe Keller as Madame Thorpe
 François Berléand as Soukaz
 Danièle Dubroux as Dominique's Friend
 Bernard Le Coq as Cordier
 Roxane Mesquida as Marine
 Jean-Louis Richard as M. Thorpe
 Jean-Claude Dauphin as Louis-Guy
 Michelle Goddet as Quentin's Mother
 Jean-Michel as Marcus
 Pierre Laroche as Robert
 Richard Schroeder as The Photographer

See also
 Isabelle Huppert on screen and stage

References

External links

1998 drama films
1998 films
1990s French-language films
French drama films
Films directed by Benoît Jacquot
Films based on works by Yukio Mishima
1990s French films